Ejule is a town in Kogi State of Nigeria.

References 

Populated places in Kogi State